Protected areas of Brunei include:
 Ulu Temburong National Park
 Ulu Ulu National Park Resort

Other 
 Andulau Forest Reserve
 Sungai Basong Recreational Park
 Benutan Resorvoir
 Berakas Recreation Park
 Imang Resorvoir
 Labi Hills Forest Reserve
 Bukit Ladan Forest Reserve
 Sungai Liang Recreation Park
 Luagan Lalak Recreation Park
 Tasek Merimbun Heritage Park
 Muara Beach Recreation Park
 Peradayan Forest Reserve
 Bukit Shahbandar Park
 Selirong Forest Reserve (Selirong Island)

References